Zarrin Khul (also Romanized as Zarrīn Khūl and Zarrin Khool; also known as Zarī Khūl-e Pā’īn and Zarīn Khūl-e Pā’īn, and Zarrīn Khūl-e Pā’īn) is a village in Saghder Rural District, Jebalbarez District, Jiroft County, Kerman Province, Iran. At the 2006 census, its population was 19, in 4 families.

References 

Populated places in Jiroft County